"Take Me to the Pilot" is a song written by English musician Elton John and songwriter Bernie Taupin, and performed by John. It was originally released on John's eponymous second album in 1970.

It was recorded at Trident Studios in London in January 1970 and released in the United States in October 1970 as the A-side of a single, with "Your Song" as the B-side. Both songs received airplay, but "Your Song" was preferred by disc jockeys, becoming the singer's first hit (on both sides of the Atlantic) and rendering "Take Me To The Pilot" as the B-side.

The country duo Brothers Osborne recorded a remake of the song for the 2018 tribute album Restoration: Reimagining the Songs of Elton John and Bernie Taupin.

Composition and inspiration
Many—including Elton John himself—find the song's lyrics cryptic and incomprehensible. John once quoted, in The Red Piano Tour in 2005, that "in the early days, there were a lot of inquiries about 'What does this song mean? What does that song mean?' and in the case of 'Take me to the pilot/Lead me through the chamber/Take me to the pilot/I am but a stranger', I have no idea! You're on your own, I tell you."

Lyricist Bernie Taupin has admitted to not knowing what the song's lyrics represent, comparing his writing style in "Pilot" to poets like "Baudelaire and Rimbaud...(who) just threw things together and went 'Wow! That sounds good'".

Legacy
The song become a staple of John's live shows and can be heard on many of his concert recordings – such as a performance with his early 1970s backup musicians, bassist Dee Murray and drummer Nigel Olsson on 17–11–70 (1970) to Live in Australia with the Melbourne Symphony Orchestra (1987) with a full scale orchestral reworking the original Paul Buckmaster score. John also performs the song in a solo version on the album Live in Moscow recorded in 1979.

There have also been numerous notable cover versions from the likes of José Feliciano, folk/blues guitarist Buzzy Linhart, British Group Orange Bicycle, R&B vocalist Ben E. King, blues icon Odetta, pianist Nate Hopkins, a duet between singers Al Jarreau and Gloria Loring, and third-season contestant George Huff on American Idol. The Who segue into it from "Saturday Night's Alright for Fighting" on the Elton John/Bernie Taupin tribute album, Two Rooms: Celebrating the Songs of Elton John & Bernie Taupin. British keyboardist Rick Wakeman covered the song (and "Your Song") on his first solo album, Piano Vibrations, which was released in 1971. In 1983, Kikki Danielsson covered the song on her Singles Bar album. American Idol season 3 winner Fantasia Barrino and Season 11 Top 3 finalist Joshua Ledet performed this song on the American Idol season 11 finale. The song was also featured in the soundtrack of the 2018 Showtime limited series Escape at Dannemora.

Format and track list
1970 US 7" single
 "Your Song" 3:57
 "Take Me to the Pilot" 3:43

1988 US 7" single
 "Take Me to the Pilot (live)" 3:58
 "Tonight (live)" 7:26

1992 US 7" single
 "Nikita"
 "Take Me to the Pilot"

1995 US CD single
 "Blessed" 4:19
 "Honky Cat (live)" 7:05
 "Take Me to the Pilot (live)" 5:55
 "The Bitch is Back (live)" 4:26

References

1970 singles
Kikki Danielsson songs
Elton John songs
Songs with music by Elton John
Songs with lyrics by Bernie Taupin
Song recordings produced by Gus Dudgeon
1970 songs
Art rock songs
DJM Records singles
Uni Records singles